Newport is a city in Washington County, Minnesota, United States. The population was 3,797 at the 2020 census. According to 2021 census estimates, the city is estimated to have a population of 4,328.

History
Newport was platted in 1857. A post office has been in operation at Newport since 1857.

Geography

Interstate 494 and U.S. Routes 10 and 61 serve as the main routes in the community.

Newport is located along the Mississippi River, southeast of the city of Saint Paul.

Demographics

2010 census
As of the census of 2010, there were 3,435 people, 1,354 households, and 875 families living in the city. The racial makeup of the city was 85.0% White, 5.0% African American, 0.7% Native American, 3.8% Asian, 0.1% Pacific Islander, 2.6% from other races, and 2.6% from two or more races. Hispanic or Latino of any race were 6.4% of the population.

There were 1,354 households, of which 31.4% had children under the age of 18 living with them, 46.8% were married couples living together, 10.9% had a female householder with no husband present, 7.0% had a male householder with no wife present, and 35.4% were non-families. 28.2% of all households were made up of individuals, and 8.6% had someone living alone who was 65 years of age or older. The average household size was 2.53 and the average family size was 3.09.

The median age in the city was 37.3 years. 24.4% of residents were under the age of 18; 8.4% were between the ages of 18 and 24; 27.5% were from 25 to 44; 28.7% were from 45 to 64; and 11.1% were 65 years of age or older. The gender makeup of the city was 51.4% male and 48.6% female.

2000 census
As of the census of 2000, there were 3,715 people, 1,418 households, and 968 families living in the city. The racial makeup of the city was 91.76% White, 1.70% African American, 0.92% Native American, 1.48% Asian, 0.11% Pacific Islander, 1.94% from other races, and 2.10% from two or more races. Hispanic or Latino of any race were 4.25% of the population.

There were 1,418 households, out of which 36.1% had children under the age of 18 living with them, 49.7% were married couples living together, 13.1% had a female householder with no husband present, and 31.7% were non-families. 24.9% of all households were made up of individuals, and 8.9% had someone living alone who was 65 years of age or older.  The average household size was 2.61 and the average family size was 3.11.

In the city, the population was spread out, with 27.4% under the age of 18, 9.5% from 18 to 24, 31.3% from 25 to 44, 22.0% from 45 to 64, and 9.9% who were 65 years of age or older.  The median age was 34 years. For every 100 females, there were 93.3 males.  For every 100 females age 18 and over, there were 94.4 males.

The median income for a household in the city was $45,373, and the median income for a family was $51,223. Males had a median income of $38,140 versus $28,527 for females. The per capita income for the city was $22,310.  About 2.4% of families and 3.7% of the population were below the poverty line, including 4.2% of those under age 18 and 8.2% of those age 65 or over.

Notable person
 Karla Bigham, Minnesota state Senator, former Washington County Commissioner

References

Cities in Minnesota
Cities in Washington County, Minnesota
Minnesota populated places on the Mississippi River